Phycomorpha is a genus of moths in the family Copromorphidae.

Species
Phycomorpha bryophylla Meyrick, 1927
Phycomorpha escharitis Meyrick, 1916
Phycomorpha metachrysa Meyrick, 1914
Phycomorpha prasinochroa (Meyrick, 1906) (originally in Copromorpha)

Alternatively placed here
Phycomorpha argophthalma Meyrick, 1932 (originally in Syncamaris)
Phycomorpha chalazombra Meyrick, 1938 (originally in Spilogenes)
Phycomorpha ilyopis Meyrick, 1930 (originally in Saridacma)
Phycomorpha phlyctaenopa Meyrick, 1926 (originally in Rhopalosetia)
Phycomorpha simplex Strand, 1915 (originally in Rhynchoferella)
Phycomorpha syncentra Meyrick, 1916 (originally in Sisyroxena)

References

Natural History Museum Lepidoptera generic names catalog

Copromorphidae
Moth genera